Jing Junhai (born December 1960) is a Chinese politician, serving since 2018 as the Governor of Jilin. Jing spent much of his career in Shaanxi province.

Biography
Jing was born in Baishui County, Shaanxi province. He joined the Chinese Communist Party in July 1982. He attended Xi'an University of Electronics and Technology (now Xidian University) with a degree in physics. He stayed at the university to become a lecturer; in June 1992 he was promoted to associate professor.

In September 1992, he was named a project leader with the Xi'an Technology and Development Zone; there he was responsible for liaising with investors outside of mainland China and headed its innovation center. In August 1997 he was promoted to deputy head of the development zone. In May 2002 he was named head of the Xi'an Development and Planning Commission. In January 2003, he became administrative head of the development zone. In November 2005, he was named a member of the Xi'an party standing committee. In January 2008, he was appointed vice governor of Shaanxi province. In May 2012, Jing was named head of the provincial party propaganda department and a member of the Shaanxi provincial party standing committee. It was said that during this time Jing worked on the expansion of the tombs of Xi Zhongxun.

Jing was named deputy head of the Propaganda Department of the Chinese Communist Party in July 2015 and deputy party chief of Beijing in April 2017. In January 2018, Jing was appointed Governor of Jilin Province. In November 2020, Jing was appointed as the CCP Secretary of Jilin.

References

Governors of Jilin
1960 births
Alternate members of the 19th Central Committee of the Chinese Communist Party
Members of the 20th Central Committee of the Chinese Communist Party
Chinese Communist Party politicians from Shaanxi
Politicians from Weinan
Xidian University alumni
Academic staff of Xidian University
Living people
Political office-holders in Beijing
Political office-holders in Shaanxi
People's Republic of China politicians from Shaanxi
Delegates to the 13th National People's Congress